George Shotwell was an American football center who played college football at the University of Pittsburgh. He attended Hanover Township High School in Hanover Township, Luzerne County, Pennsylvania.  Shotwell attended the University of Pittsburgh, where he played for the Pittsburgh Panthers football team and was recognized as a consensus first-team All-American in 1934. He was later head coach of Hazleton High School in Hazleton, Pennsylvania from 1936 to 1937.

References

1911 births
1981 deaths
American football centers
Pittsburgh Panthers football players
All-American college football players
High school football coaches in Pennsylvania
Sportspeople from Wilkes-Barre, Pennsylvania
Players of American football from Pennsylvania